Impossible Things is a collection of short stories by Connie Willis, first published in january 1994, that includes tales of ecological disaster, humorous satire, tragedy, and satirical alternate realities. Its genres range from comedy to tragedy to horror. Three of the stories are Nebula Award winners, and two of these also won Hugo Awards.

Like her novel Bellwether, the stories In the Late Cretaceous and At the Rialto explore aspects of scientific research. Like All Seated on the Ground, the story Spice Pogrom involves first contact with an intelligent alien species. Like the two-part novel Blackout/All Clear, the story Jack involves life during The Blitz. The stories Ado and Winter's Tale both refer to William Shakespeare, while Time Out, like her time travel novels, explores the nature of time.

Contents
 "The Last of the Winnebagos" (1988) (Hugo and Nebula Award winner)
 "Even the Queen" (1992) (Hugo and Nebula Award winner)
 "Schwarzschild Radius" (1987)
 "Ado" (1988)
 "Spice Pogrom" (1986)
 "Winter's Tale" (1988)
 "Chance" (1986)
 "In the Late Cretaceous" (1991)
 "Time Out" (1989)
 "Jack" (1991)
 "At the Rialto" (1989) (Nebula Award winner)

References

1994 short story collections
Science fiction short story collections
American short story collections
Works by Connie Willis